Small change may refer to:  
 Coins, particularly those of low value  
 Small Change (film), 1976, directed by François Truffaut  
 Small Change (Tom Waits album), 1976  
 Small Change (Prism album), 1981  
 Small Change trilogy, a series of novels by Jo Walton  
 Small Changes, a 1969 collection by Hal Clement